Konrad Ryushin Marchaj was from October 2009 to January 2015 abbot of Zen Mountain Monastery, the main house of the Mountains and Rivers Order (MRO) of Zen Buddhism, founded by John Daido Loori, Roshi, from whom Marchaj received shiho in June 2009. Ryushin entered into full-time residence at the Monastery in 1992 and became abbot there following Daido Roshi's death in 2009. 

As abbot and resident teacher, Ryushin oversaw the training and operations of the Monastery, working closely with Geoffrey Shugen Arnold, Roshi, who is the head of the Mountains and Rivers Order. 

Ryushin came to the dharma through Vipassana meditation, eventually shifting to Zen practice and taking Daido Roshi as his teacher. Prior to ordination, Ryushin was a pediatrician and a psychiatrist. 

In January 2015 at the request of Shugen Roshi, Ryushin stepped down as abbot after it became known he had been involved in a brief affair.

He is now teaching independently.

References

External links
  Marchaj's appearance on PBS

Living people
American Zen Buddhists
1953 births